1689 Floris-Jan, provisional designation , is a stony asteroid and a slow rotator from the inner regions of the asteroid belt, approximately 16 kilometers in diameter. Discovered by Hendrik van Gent in 1930, it was named after a contest winner of an exhibition at Leiden Observatory.

Discovery 

It was discovered on 16 September 1930, by Dutch astronomer Hendrik van Gent at the Leiden Southern Station, annex to the Johannesburg Observatory in South Africa. It was independently discovered by Soviet astronomer Evgenii Skvortsov at the Crimean Simeiz Observatory five days later.

Orbit and classification 

Floris-Jan orbits the Sun in the inner main-belt at a distance of 1.9–3.0 AU once every 3 years and 10 months (1,401 days). Its orbit has an eccentricity of 0.21 and an inclination of 6° with respect to the ecliptic.

Physical characteristics

Slow rotator 

In the 1980s, photometric lightcurve observations already revealed that Floris-Jan is a very slow rotator with a rotation period of 145 hours and a brightness variation of 0.4 magnitude. At the time, this six-day period was a new record among all minor planets with a known rotation period, and it was assumed, that Floris-Jan might also be a tumbling asteroid with a non-principal axis rotation.

Diameter and albedo 

According to the surveys carried out by the Japanese Akari satellite and NASA's Wide-field Infrared Survey Explorer with its subsequent NEOWISE mission, Floris-Jan measures between 13.74 and 16.12 kilometers in diameter, and its surface has an albedo between 0.127 and 0.184. The Collaborative Asteroid Lightcurve Link agrees with Petr Pravec's revised WISE-data, that is an albedo of 0.135 and a diameter of 16.21 kilometers based on an absolute magnitude of 11.74.

Naming 

This minor planet was named for Floris-Jan van der Meulen, the 5,000th visitor to a 14-day astronomical exhibition at the Leiden Observatory. The official  was published by the Minor Planet Center on 1 March 1973.

References

External links 
 Asteroid Lightcurve Database (LCDB), query form (info )
 Dictionary of Minor Planet Names, Google books
 Asteroids and comets rotation curves, CdR – Observatoire de Genève, Raoul Behrend
 Discovery Circumstances: Numbered Minor Planets (1)-(5000) – Minor Planet Center
 
 

001689
Discoveries by Hendrik van Gent
Named minor planets
001689
19300916